Castle Building Centres Group Limited (Castle) is the oldest Canadian-based, cooperatively-owned buying group of lumber and building materials.  The members of the group are known as shareholders to reflect their cooperative association.

Castle produces the Contractor Advantage, a magazine published bi-monthly and distributed nationally.  Articles in the magazine are specifically geared toward products, trends and the business side of contracting.

Banners 
Castle members do not necessarily fly a 'Castle' branded banner, as the store owners are independent and can choose to fly any non-competitive banner.  Many stores do not even have a brand associated directly with the name of their store, opting for something more familiar in their market.

Some banners that are in use today include:

 Castle
 True Value
 Do-It Best
 Ace Hardware
 Pro Hardware

Recently, more stores have been adopting the Castle banner.

History 
The company began in 1963 when a group of dealers in Ontario formed BOLD Lumber (Buying Organization of Lumber Dealers).  BOLD's ambition was to negotiate their pricing with suppliers based on their collective volume.  After their first year, they grew from 6 to 20 dealers.  By 1969, the business charter was adjusted to expand beyond 50 dealers.  Membership grew from across the country, giving BOLD a national presence.

In 1969, the Board of Directors rejected the notion of a public share offering and franchising concepts in favour of encouraging the independent control by its members.

The name changed to Castle Building Centres Group Limited in 1982.  The company at this time had grown to 157.  The first Castle logo appeared in brown, white and gold.  Castle was among the first to introduce the concept of the drive-thru lumberyard concept.

As "big box stores" emerged in Canada, Castle's member stores continued their growth as independent businesses looked for competitive advantages.

It was apparent that the focus on lumber and building materials set the typical Castle store apart.  Optional supplemental programs were made available to help member stores with their specific needs, such as local fliers, television spots, health & safety tools, and insurance.  The Castle logo was also updated to blue, yellow and white.

In 2007, Castle's President and industry notable Provan Wylie retired.  Replacing him was Ken Jenkins, formerly of gypsum manufacturer CGC Inc.

External links
Castle Web Site
Commercial Building Supplies Web Site

Hardware stores of Canada
Retail companies established in 1963
Retailers' cooperatives
Cooperatives in Canada
Companies based in Mississauga